Victoria Summer (born 15 December 1981) is an English actress, model and singer. After beginning her career in horror films, Summer transitioned into more mainstream roles starting with the Brian Herzlinger film How Sweet It Is. She played Julie Andrews in Saving Mr. Banks, a 2013 film about the making of Mary Poppins.

Career
Summer started her career with a scholarship to the Arts Educational School in London and appeared in the Golden Jubilee of Queen Elizabeth II in 2002.

Summer landed her first role in the 2006 low budget horror film The Zombie Diaries,
which was picked up for distribution by the Weinstein Company. Summer relocated to Los Angeles in 2009 and secured the lead in a modern retelling of Bram Stoker's Dracula entitled Dracula Reborn.

In 2010, Summer starred in a Subaru commercial for Spike TV which debuted at the 2010 Scream Awards.

In 2011, she was cast as British teacher with anger management issues in the Brian Herzlinger film How Sweet It Is. She released her debut single, "Love Will Have to Wait", later that year.

Summer played Julie Andrews in the Disney film Saving Mr. Banks, a 2013 film about the making of Mary Poppins. She appeared in the 3D action film Ratapocalypse, in which she sings.

She appeared in Transformers: Age of Extinction as one of three executive assistants to Stanley Tucci's character.

In 2016, Summer played the leading role as British nurse, Eleanor Morgan, in the Damien Lay film, Game of Aces.

Personal life
Summer was born in Reading, Berkshire, England. She is involved in animal rights protection and acts as a spokesperson for veganism with PETA.
In July 2020, Summer announced her engagement to Italian born Michelin star chef, Fabrizio Vaccaro, in Hello!.

Filmography

Television

References

Further reading
The Sunday Times Fame & Fortune Interview
Berkshire Life Magazine Interview
Berkshire Living Magazine Interview
The DIS Interview
Fault Magazine Interview
Line Magazine Interview

External links

 Official site
 

1981 births
Living people
English film actresses
English songwriters
People from Wokingham
English female models
21st-century English actresses
21st-century English women singers
21st-century English singers
Actresses from Berkshire